Robert Shearer Law (born 24 December 1965) is a Scottish former footballer who played as a midfielder or right back; his longest spell was with Partick Thistle where he spent eleven seasons, making over 300 appearances and scoring ten goals for the Jags in all competitions. He also played for St Mirren, Ayr United and Stenhousemuir towards the end of his career, which was bookended by time in the junior leagues in Lanarkshire.

References

1965 births
Living people
Footballers from Bellshill
Scottish footballers
Association football fullbacks
Association football midfielders
Partick Thistle F.C. players
Stonehouse Violet F.C. players
St Mirren F.C. players
Ayr United F.C. players
Stenhousemuir F.C. players
Kilsyth Rangers F.C. players
Scottish Football League players
Scottish Junior Football Association players